These are the results of the 1997 United Kingdom general election in Wales. The election was held on 1 May 1997 and all 40 seats in Wales were contested. The Labour Party won a landslide majority of Welsh MPs, gaining seven seats for a total of 34 out of 40. The Liberal Democrats gained one seat, whilst Plaid Cymru retained their four MPs.

The Conservatives lost all of their Welsh MPs, leaving them without representation in Wales for the first time since the 1906 general election. They would not gain another MP until the 2005 general election.

Results
Below is a table summarising the results of the 1997 general election in Wales.

Results by constituency 

The following is the results by constituency by Senedd electoral region:

Mid and West Wales 
Mid and West Wales elected 8 Members of Parliament.

North Wales 
North Wales elected 9 Members of Parliament.

South Central Wales 
South Central Wales elected 8 Members of Parliament.

South East Wales 
South East Wales elected 8 Members of Parliament.

South West Wales 
South West Wales elected 7 Members of Parliament.

External links

References

Wales
General election in Wales
1990s elections in Wales
1997